Matilda is а 2017 Russian historical romantic drama film directed by Alexei Uchitel. It was released in cinemas on October 26, 2017. The picture tells the story about the relationship between ballerina Matilda Kshesinskaya and Nicholas II.

Criticised by monarchist groups as a "distortion of historical events", the picture became controversial after State Duma deputy Natalia Poklonskaya led a campaign to ban the film on religious grounds.

The premiere of the film took place on October 23, 2017 at the Mariinsky Theatre in St. Petersburg.

Plot
The film tells the story of the romantic relationship between the heir to the Russian throne, Nikolai Aleksandrovich Romanov, and the ballerina of the Imperial Theater, Matilda Kshesinskaya, from the time the 22-year-old tsesarevich and 17-year-old dancer met in 1890 to the coronation of Nikolai and his wife Aleksandra Feodorovna in 1896.

Cast

Reception
The film received mixed reviews in Russian media. Yuri Grymov and Stas Tyrkin from Komsomolskaya Pravda differed in their opinions; Grymow criticized the film, citing the muddled nature of the picture, while Tyrkin gave a positive review.

Egor Belikov from Time Out and Andrey Piskov from The Hollywood Reporter described the film as an overblown melodrama.

Meduzas Anton Dolin praised the film; he complimented the fairy-tale like atmosphere, cinematography, sets and costumes.

Controversy 
In 2016 when the official trailer of the film which contained in particular erotic love scenes was released, representatives of the public movement "King's Cross" found in the upcoming film a "distortion of historical events", and an "anti-Russian and anti-religious provocation in the field of culture". One cinema chain pulled out of showing the film after a group of self-described Orthodox militants threatened the film’s director and cinemas preparing to screen it.

After a request to the Prosecutor General of the Russian Federation from the Duma deputy Natalia Poklonskaya known for her veneration of Nicholas II, the film's material was audited and no violations were found. The Chairman of the Duma Committee on Culture, film director Stanislav Govoruhin, criticized the idea of checking the film, he expressed confidence that such scandalous initiatives should be "nipped right in the bud." In the Kremlin, Poklonskaya’s request caused confusion and an uncertain delayed response. The Ministry of Culture said that the question of issuing certificates for rental of the film will be decided upon the completion of work on the picture.

Somewhat later in December 2016 it was reported that the prosecutor's office would request the movie's script for inspection at the request of deputy Poklonskaya.

In September 2017, Cinema Park and Formula Kino group, Russia's biggest cinema chain, cancelled screenings of the film due to "extreme actions by opponents of the film" and threats made against cinemas. They later reversed the decision. Two cars were torched outside the Moscow office of a lawyer acting for Alexei Uchitel, the director of the film.

On 4 September, an ultra-Orthodox participant in a monarchist rally against the film rammed the entrance to the Cosmos cinema, the largest in Yekaterinburg, with his car. In the car there was a barrel of gasoline and gas cylinders. The criminal set fire to the car with a Molotov cocktail and tried to escape but was soon detained. The court released him from criminal liability because it deemed him insane. For the same reason, the owners of the cinema did not receive compensation for the damage caused (19.3 million rubles in their estimation).

Attempts of a ban
Director of the office of the Russian Imperial House Aleksandr Zakatov called the film "blasphemy" but added that "such works should be condemned, but to inflate a scandal around them and make a formal ban does not make sense". A similar position was taken by the Bishop of Yegoryevsk Tikhon (Shevkunov), who reviewed the film highly critically but said that the demand to ban the film "is an absolutely dead-end and wrong approach":

Nevertheless, Bishop Tihon pointed out, "most likely, individuals and groups, including Orthodox, will demand its prohibition".

Production
More than 17 tons of fabric were used to create a total of more than 5,000 costumes.

References

External links
 

2017 films
2010s historical romance films
2017 romantic drama films
Films directed by Alexei Uchitel
Political controversies in film
Obscenity controversies in film
Russian historical drama films
Russian romantic drama films
Films about ballet
2017 biographical drama films
Russian biographical drama films
Biographical films about Russian royalty
Cultural depictions of Nicholas II of Russia
Films set in the Russian Empire
Films set in Saint Petersburg
Films set in the 1890s
2010s Russian-language films